Local elections were held at Quezon City on May 9, 2022, as part of the Philippine general election. Held concurrently with the national elections, the electorate voted to elect a mayor, a vice mayor, thirty-six city council members and six district representatives to congress. Those elected took their respective offices on June 30, 2022, for a three-year-long term. 1,138,511 of 1,403,895 registered voters voted in this election. 

Joy Belmonte and Gian Sotto were re-elected to the mayoralty and vice mayoralty respectively. The Serbisyo sa Bayan Party with its coalition with PDP-Laban and the Nacionalista Party won a combined 28 seats in the city council, effectively securing the coalition an outright majority in the legislative body. Meanwhile, the UniTeam backed opposition coalition, Malayang Quezon City won 6 seats in the city council. 

Arjo Atayde, Raffy Tulfo Jr., Franz Pumaren, Marvin Rillo, PM Vargas and Marivic Co-Pilar were elected to represent the city's first, second, third, fourth, fifth and sixth legislative districts respectively in the 19th Congress.

Background
Incumbent Mayor Joy Belmonte is running for her second term against Anakalugusan party-list representative Mike Defensor.

Vice Mayor Gian Sotto is running for his second term against incumbent second district Councilor Winnie Castelo.

In the congressional race, four incumbent representatives, Anthony Peter Crisologo, Precious Hipolito-Castelo, Allan Benedict Reyes and Bong Suntay are running for reelection in the 1st, 2nd, 3rd and 4th districts respectively. 5th District Representative Alfred Vargas and 6th District Representative Kit Belmonte are term-limited.

Tickets

Administration coalition

Primary opposition coalition

Other coalitions

Opinion polling

Mayoral election
The incumbent mayor is Joy Belmonte, who was elected in 2019 with 54.09% of the vote. She ran for re-election to a second term under the Serbisyo sa Bayan Party.

Belmonte faced a challenge from eight other candidates; including representative Mike Defensor of the Malayang Quezon City coalition. Defensor was endorsed by UniTeam senatorial candidate Herbert Bautista and presidential candidate Bongbong Marcos.

Candidates 

 Glenda Araneta (Independent)
 Ricardo Bello (PDSP)
 Joy Belmonte (SBP), Incumbent mayor (2019 - present)
 Mike Defensor (PFP), Representative for Anakalusugan Party-list (2019 - 2022)
 Jose Ingles Jr. (WPP)
 Rolando Jota (Independent)
 Wilhelmina Orozco (Independent)
 Tomas Salutan Jr. (Independent)
 Diosdado Velasco (Independent)

Results 
Belmonte handily defeated Defensor, winning with a greater margin compared with her neophyte campaign.

Vice mayoral election
Incumbent Gian Sotto is running for his second term, facing his distant relative, former 2nd district representative and councilor Winnie Castelo and two other candidates.

| colspan="5" |Source:

Congressional elections

1st District
Incumbent Anthony Peter "Onyx" Crisologo was defeated by actor Arjo Atayde in his reelection bid. The third placer was MSME entrepreneur Marcus Aurelius Dee.

Among the three running, Crisologo (has lived in Heroes Hills, Brgy. Santa Cruz his whole life) and Dee of Del Monte are the only natives of District 1.

2nd District
Another Lakas-CMD-affiliated incumbent, Precious Hipolito-Castelo, lost in her reelection bid at the hands of independent Ralph Tulfo, son of broadcaster and Senator Raffy Tulfo. Four other independents also ran.

3rd District
Incumbent Allan Benedict Reyes lost his seat to his former ally, incumbent councilor Franz Pumaren. The third placer was independent candidate Jessie Dignadice.

4th District
Incumbent Bong Suntay was running for reelection against former councilor Marvin Rillo. Rillo defeated Suntay in a close race with a 1.18% difference of 1,948 votes.

It was the only congressional race won by Lakas-CMD in Quezon City in this election. (The former lost its reelection bids in the first two districts, both at the hands of independent candidates.)

5th District
Alfred Vargas is on his third term as representative and is barred to seek reelection. Instead, he ran for councilor in the same district. His party nominated his brother, incumbent councilor PM Vargas.

PM Vargas won the seat against six other candidates, including the second placer, businesswoman Rose Lin; former 2nd District representative Mary Ann Susano; and four independent candidates. Lin was originally nominated by Lakas–CMD but she later resigned from the party on November 19, 2021 after her name was embroiled in the Pharmally Pharmaceutical scandal. (Her husband, Allan Lin Weixiong, was the financial manager of Pharmally.)

6th District
Incumbent Jose Christopher "Kit" Belmonte, a Liberal Party member and a close relative of Mayor Joy Belmonte, is on his final term as representative and is barred to seek reelection. 

Running for the vacant position were former representatives Bingbong Crisologo and Tricia Nicole Velasco-Catera of Ang Mata'y Alagaan (MATA) partylist, and incumbent councilor Marivic Co-Pilar, an ally of Joy Belmonte. Co-Pilar won the election after getting 60% of votes cast.

City council elections

1st District

|-
| colspan="5" style="background:black;"|

2nd District

|-
| colspan="5" style="background:black;"|

3rd District

|-
| colspan="5" style="background:black;"|

4th District

|-
| colspan="5" style="background:black;"|

5th District

|-
| colspan="5" style="background:black;"|

6th District

|-
| colspan="5" style="background:black;"|

References

2022 Philippine local elections
Elections in Quezon City
May 2022 events in the Philippines
Politics of Quezon City
2022 elections in Metro Manila